H51 may refer to:
 , a Royal Navy H-class submarine
 , a Royal Navy S-class destroyer
 Lockheed H-51, an experimental American helicopter